Mahmoud Al Malloul (born January 1, 1985, in Homs) is a Syrian football player who is currently playing for Al-Shorta in the Syrian Premier League.

External links
Profile at Kooora

References

1985 births
Living people
Syrian footballers
Al-Karamah players
Association football midfielders
Sportspeople from Homs
Syrian Premier League players